Ease of movement (EMV) is an indicator used in technical analysis to relate an asset's price change to its volume. Ease of Movement was developed by Richard W. Arms, Jr. and highlights the relationship between volume and price changes and is particularly useful for assessing the strength of a trend. High positive values indicate the price is increasing on low volume: strong negative values indicate the price is dropping on low volume. The moving average of the indicator can be added to act as a trigger line, which is similar to other indicators like the MACD.

References 

Technical indicators